The brachial artery is the major blood vessel of the (upper) arm. It is the continuation of the axillary artery beyond the lower margin of teres major muscle. It continues down the ventral surface of the arm until it reaches the cubital fossa at the elbow. It then divides into  the radial and ulnar arteries which run down the forearm. In some individuals, the bifurcation occurs much earlier and the ulnar and radial arteries extend through the upper arm. The pulse of the brachial artery is palpable on the anterior aspect of the elbow, medial to the tendon of the biceps, and, with the use of a stethoscope and sphygmomanometer (blood pressure cuff), often used to measure the blood pressure.

The brachial artery is closely related to the median nerve; in proximal regions, the median nerve is immediately lateral to the brachial artery. Distally, the median nerve crosses the medial side of the brachial artery and lies anterior to the elbow joint.

Structure
The brachial artery gives rise to the following branches:

Profunda brachii artery (deep brachial artery)
Superior ulnar collateral artery
Inferior ulnar collateral artery
Radial artery (a terminal branch)
Ulnar artery (a terminal branch)
 Nutrient branches to the humerus

It also gives rise to important anastomotic networks of the elbow and (as the axillary artery) the shoulder.

The biceps head is lateral to the brachial artery. The median nerve is medial to the brachial artery for most of its course.

Additional images

See also
 Femoral artery, a leg-based artery with a similar function

References

External links

 Dissection at mvm.ed.ac.uk
 Image at umich.edu - pulse
 

Arteries of the upper limb